Mader or Mäder or Máder (English pronunciation: /'mɑːdær/) is a German surname. Notable people with the surname include:

 Charles L. Mader (born 1930), American chemist
 Carlos Mäder (born 1978) Ghanaian-Swiss alpine skier
 Doris Mader (born 1976), Austrian artist
 Georg Mader (1824–1881), Austrian artist
 Gino Mäder (born 1997), Swiss racing cyclist
 Günther Mader (born 1964), Austrian skier
 Hellmuth Mäder
 Julius Mader (1928–2000), German jurist, political scientist, journalist and writer
 Kelly Mader (1952–2016), American rancher and politician
 Logan Mader (born 1970), Canadian guitarist and music producer
 Malu Mader (born 1966), Brazilian actress
 Markus Mader
 Rebecca Mader (born 1979), British actress
 Rezső Máder
 Ruth Mader (born 1974), Austrian film maker
 Troy Mader (1955–2016), American rancher and politician
 Xavier Mader

See also 
 Mader (disambiguation)

German-language surnames